Ricky Aitamai (born 22 December 1991) is a soccer player from Tahiti currently playing for A.S. Vénus and for Tahiti national football team.
He was part of the Tahitian squad at the 2013 FIFA Confederations Cup in Brazil.

References

1991 births
Living people
French Polynesian footballers
Tahiti international footballers
2013 FIFA Confederations Cup players
2016 OFC Nations Cup players
Association football midfielders